Loenen is a village in the Dutch province of Gelderland. It is located in the municipality of Apeldoorn, about 10 km southeast of that city.

Loenen was a separate municipality until 1818, when it was merged with Apeldoorn.

National Cemetery of Honours

Near the village of Loenen is the National Cemetery of Honours (Nationaal Ereveld Loenen), In 1948, it was decided to create a national cemetery of honours for the resistance fighters, political prisoners, and soldiers who died during World War II and were buried outside of the Netherlands. There are close to 4,000 people buried at the cemetery

In the centre is a chapel dedicated to the Engelandvaarders, the men and women who attempted to escape from the Netherlands to England, and a funerary urn containing earth from the concentration camps Majdanek, Sobibor and Treblinka. In the back is the list of the 130,000 people whose remains have not been located.

Notable people 
 Willem Albert Scholten (1819–1895), industrialist and landowner

References 

Populated places in Gelderland
Former municipalities of Gelderland
World War II cemeteries in the Netherlands
Apeldoorn